Tekirdağ station is a railway station in Tekirdağ. It was opened on September 1, 2010, along with the opening of the Muratlı-Tekirdağ railway.

Railway stations in Tekirdağ Province
Railway stations opened in 2010
Buildings and structures in Tekirdağ Province
Transport in Tekirdağ Province